Guillaume de Deguileville (1295 - before 1358) was a French Cistercian and writer. His authorship is shown by one acrostic in Le Pèlerinage de la Vie Humaine, two in Le Pèlerinage de l'Âme, and one in Le Pèlerinage de Jhesucrist. These acrostics take the form of a series of stanzas, each beginning with a letter of Deguileville's name. According to indications in the Vie
his father was called Thomas, he was named after his godfather, and his patron saint was William of Chaalis. There is no evidence that his name is connected with a village of Guileville.

Life and writings
Guillaume entered the Cistercian abbey of Chaalis in 1316, at the age of twenty-one. This is in agreement with his assertion in the second redaction of the Vie, where he states that he has been in the abbey for thirty-nine years. The abbey of Chaalis—or what is left of it, for it is no more than a ruin nowadays—is in the diocese of Senlis, north of Paris, and was founded in the twelfth century. A manuscript of a French prose rendering of the Âme states that Guillaume eventually became prior of Chaalis, but it is not known whether this is true or, if so, when this happened.

According to the second redaction of the Vie, Guillaume was thirty-six years old when he wrote his first redaction in 1330, so he must have been born ca. 1294. The Âme was written immediately after the second redaction of the Vie (1355), and in it he states that he was over 60 years old when writing the Âme. He also refers to a passage in the Vie which only occurs in the second redaction of the poem, which is another indication that he wrote the Âme after 1355. Guillaume wrote this second redaction of the Vie, he states in its prologue, because the first redaction had been stolen. This does not mean that this first redaction was lost to posterity, for, according to Clubb in the introduction of his edition of Egerton 615, J. J. Stürzinger based his edition of Vie on it.

We can date Deguileville’s poems as follows: The first version of the Vie was written between
1330 and 1332; the second version of it around 1355; the Âme between 1355 and 1358; and Jhesucrist about 1358. Some seventy-three manuscripts of Guillaume’s works, including forty-six of the Âme, are extant in various libraries in Europe. The only edition of Guillaume’s three poems is that of Stürzinger, who based his edition of the Vie on the first redaction. The second redaction has never been edited.

Although the surviving manuscripts of the Pèlerinage trilogy render the author's name as "Guillaume de Deguileville", a number of other variants can be found in both medieval and modern sources. One alternative spelling is Guillaume de Deguilleville. Modernized form Guillaume de Digulleville is also used. A different interpretation of the surname gives Guillaume de Guileville or Guillaume de Guilleville. The Latin version of the name is Guillermus de Deguilevilla.

English translations
It was not until the 15th century that the first two parts of the Pèlerinage trilogy, Pèlerinage de la Vie Humaine and Pèlerinage de l'Âme, appeared in English. The Pilgrimage of the Soul, anonymous but sometimes attributed to John Lydgate or Thomas Hoccleve, is known at least 10 complete and 3 partial manuscripts. The date for the translation is omitted in some manuscripts, and given as either 1400 or 1413 in others, one specifically saying it "endeth in the vigyle of Seynt Bartholomew", that is, August 24. This last quote, with 1413 dating, is also repeated in the first printed edition published by William Caxton in 1483.
 
However, a considerably older English version of one fragment is known. Geoffrey Chaucer's poem ABC is in fact a translation of a prayer to Virgin Mary from Pèlerinage de la Vie Humaine. The form of the translation, closely modelled on that of the French original, is a particular type of an alphabetical poem. Both acrostics are composed of 23 stanzas, 12-lines-long in Guillaume's case and 8-lines-long in Chaucer's, each stanza beginning with letters from A to Z in order (J, U, and W excluded). While its precise date is not known, it is certainly a 14th-century work, pre-dating Chaucer's death in 1400; it may even be one of his earliest works, although this can not be proved conclusively. The main evidence comes from the Second Chaucer edition published by Thomas Speght in 1602. According to Speght, the poem was written, "some say", by the order of Blanche, duchess of Lancaster, the mother of King Henry IV. If this story is indeed a record of a genuine medieval tradition, the poem would have been written in 1368 at the latest, as Blanche died that year. This would make ABC Chaucer's earliest work, preceding The Book of the Duchess, an elegy commemorating Blanche's death.

Edition
 Stürzinger, Jakob J. (ed.) Le pèlerinage de la vie humaine; edited by J. J. Stürzinger. London: Printed for the Roxburghe Club [by] Nichols & Sons. "The following Pelerinage de vie humaine is the first recension of the first Pilgrimage as written by the author in the years 1330 to 1332. The text is printed from MS. t, a fourteenth-century manuscript preserved in the Bibliothèque nationale at Paris, marked: Fonds franc. no. 1818, which offered the best text, and is in a spelling that differs but slightly from that of the author"—P. [v].
 The first two books of the trilogy have been translated into modern English, with introduction and commentary, by Eugene S. Clasby: The Pilgrimage of Human Life (Garland Library of Medieval Literature, 1992) and The Pilgrimage of the Soul (Arizona Center for Medieval and Renaissance Studies, 2016).

ABC
 Dor, Juliette, 'L'ABC de Chaucer: traduction et transformation'; in Frédéric Duval and Fabienne Pomel, eds, Guillaume de Diguleville. Les Pèlerinages allégoriques(Presses universitaires de Rennes, colloque de Cerisy, 2008, pp. 401-413).

References

Sources

External links
A text edition of The Pylgremage of the Sowle.
 
 MS 241/2 Le pèlerinage de la vie humaine at OPenn

French Cistercians
13th-century French writers
14th-century French writers
French male writers